Accademia Italiana Skopje is fashion and design institute, an affiliate center of the Accademia Italiana. The Skopje campus is aimed at serving students from all over the Balkan region, and offers design degrees recognized by the Ministry of Education and Science in Macedonia, valid in more than 40 European countries.
Lessons at this center are held in the English language. 

Programs active in the following areas: 

- Fashion Design

- Interior and Product Design

- Graphic Design and Visual Communications

References

1. https://web.archive.org/web/20080309073647/http://www.avantgarde.com.mk/ Avantgarde Magazine #13, June 2008

2. https://web.archive.org/web/20080215075347/http://skopjefair.com.mk/manifestacii/obrazovanie/obrazovanie_izlagaci.htm

3. http://www.fair.bg/en/downloads/firmslist.htm?guid={1A8FDE65-D72B-4B4A-80A1-31C7B6617B65}

4. http://www.fashionmk.com/news_details.php?id=290

5. https://web.archive.org/web/20080630225129/http://www.mon.gov.mk/en/home/

External links 
 Official Website
 

Design schools
Educational institutions established in 2006
2006 establishments in the Republic of Macedonia